The 2021 Veikkausliiga was the 91st season of top-tier football in Finland. HJK were the defending champions and successfully defended their title.

Teams
RoPS (relegated after eight years in the top flight) were relegated to Ykkönen after finishing at the bottom of the 2020 season. Their place was taken by Ykkönen champions AC Oulu (promoted after a ten-year absence). 

TPS (relegated after one year in the top flight) as 11th-placed team lost their Veikkausliiga spot after losing to second-placed Ykkönen team KTP (promoted after a five-year absence) in a relegation/promotion playoff.

Stadia and locations

Personnel and kits
Note: Flags indicate national team as has been defined under FIFA eligibility rules. Players and Managers may hold more than one non-FIFA nationality.

League table

Results

Championship round

Relegation round

Relegation play-offs

First Leg

Second Leg

Statistics

Top goalscorers

Awards

Annual awards

Team of the Year

References

External links
 Official website
 Soccerway 

Veikkausliiga seasons
Vei
Fin
Fin
|}